Couleur (from French, meaning colour in English) is the expression used in Central European Studentenverbindungen for the various headgear and distinctive ribbons worn by members of these student societies.

There are three classes of such student societies:
 Societies with no colours (so called schwarz, in English black)
 Societies with colours but wearing no ribbon, no cap etc. They wear their colours e.g. in their coat of arms or as Zipfel.
 Societies with colours and wearing a ribbon, a cap etc.

Ribbon

The ribbon (so called Band) is worn over the right shoulder to the left hip. Both ends are held together by a button, often fashioned from metal or porcelain. These buttons are often engraved or enameled with a Zirkel and at times even specific coat of arms associated with the student society in question. A lot of societies distinguish two types of ribbons. One is used by the new members (so called Fux or Fuchs, after the German "fox"), the other one is used by the elder members (so called Bursche or, if with degree,  Alter Herr). The ribbons of the elder members show the original or full colours of the society, where the ribbons of the new members often show a variation of them, such as displaying only two of the three main colours.

Headgear

Cap

Mostly a cap (so called Mütze) consists of:
 a black peak,
 a crown coloured by one of the colours of the ribbon,
 a band with the colours of the ribbon.

There are various forms of caps, e.g.:
 Biedermeierformat,
 Tellermütze,
 Stürmer.

Stürmer
A special and seldom  seen form of headgear is the Stürmer (English hotspur). 
It has a black peak, a black band and the top of the crown points to the front. The crown is also coloured by one of the colours of the ribbon. Sometimes a Zirkel is embroidered on the top. Traditionally, the Stürmer is only worn in the summer semester of the academic year.

Tönnchen

Straßencerevis

See also
 List of student boilersuit colours

References

Further reading
 R.G.S. Weber: The German Corps in the Third Reich Macmillan London
 Peter Krause: O alte Burschenherrlichkeit - Die Studenten und ihr Brauchtum, Graz, Wien, Köln 1979 (German), 
 Peter Krause: O alte Burschenherrlichkeit - Die Studenten und ihr Brauchtum, 5. verb. Auflage, Graz, Wien, Köln 1997 (German), 
 Paulgerhard Gladen: Gaudeamus igitur - Die studentischen Verbindungen einst und jetzt, Köln 2001 (German),
 Marc Zirlewagen (Hg.): Wir siegen oder fallen - Deutsche Studenten im Ersten Weltkrieg, Köln 2008 (German), 
 Edgar Hunger / Curt Meyer: Studentisches Brauchtum, Bonn, Stuttgart 1958 (German)

Student societies in Germany
Academic culture
Academic dress
Ribbon symbolism